Cratocerus is a genus of beetles in the family Carabidae, containing the following species:

 Cratocerus culpepperi Grzymala & Will, 2014
Cratocerus indupalmensis Grzymala & Will, 2014
Cratocerus kavanaughi Grzymala & Will, 2014
Cratocerus monilicornis Dejean, 1829
Cratocerus multisetosus Grzymala & Will, 2014
Cratocerus sinesetosus Grzymala & Will, 2014
 Cratocerus sulcatus Chaudoir, 1852
Cratocerus tanyae Grzymala & Will, 2014

References

Pterostichinae